General Sir Harry Burrard, 1st Baronet (1 June 1755 – 17 October 1813) was a British soldier who fought in the American War of Independence, the French Revolutionary Wars and in the Peninsular War.

Biography
Burrard was born at Walhampton on 1 June 1755, the elder son of George Burrard of Walhampton, Hampshire, who was the third son of Paul Burrard, M.P. for Lymington from 1706 to 1736, and younger brother of Sir Harry Burrard, M.P. for Lymington from 1741 to 1784 and created a baronet in 1769.

Burrard became an ensign in the Coldstream Guards in 1772. He was promoted lieutenant and captain in 1773, and in 1777 exchanged into the 60th Foot, in order to see service in the American War of Independence. With his regiment he served under Sir William Howe in 1778 and 1779—He was captured during a raid on the Bruges canal in 1798. He led the 2nd Brigade during the 1799 Anglo-Russian invasion of Holland, fighting at the battles of Bergen, Egmont and Castricum. In 1780 returned to England on being elected M.P. for Lymington through the influence of his uncle Sir Harry. He served under Lord Cornwallis in America in 1781 and 1782.

After peace had been declared he returned to the guards in 1786 as lieutenant and captain in the grenadier guards, and was promoted captain and lieutenant-colonel in 1789. With the guards he served in Flanders from 1793 to 1795, and was promoted colonel in 1795, and major-general in 1798. In 1804 he became lieutenant-colonel commanding the 1st Foot Guards, and in 1805 he was promoted lieutenant-general.

In 1807 he received his first command in the expedition to Copenhagen under Lord Cathcart, when he commanded the 1st Division, and as senior general under Cathcart acted as second in command. He had very little to do in the expedition; yet on his return he was created a baronet, and also made governor of Calshot Castle.

In 1808 he was selected to supersede Sir Arthur Wellesley. He arrived on the coast of Portugal on 19 August, and wisely decided not to interfere with Sir Arthur Wellesley's arrangements. On 21 August Junot attacked Sir Arthur's position at Vimeiro, and was successfully beaten off, and the English general had just ordered Ferguson to pursue the beaten enemy, when Burrard assumed the chief command, and, believing the French had a reserve as yet untouched, forbade Ferguson to advance. The very next day Sir Hew Dalrymple assumed the chief command, and made the Convention of Cintra, with the full concurrence of Burrard, while Wellesley was ordered to do so due to his opposition to the convention. All three generals were recalled, and a court of inquiry was appointed to examine their conduct. Burrard succinctly declared the reasons for his course of action on 21 August.  While the inquiry officially absolved all three, unofficially the blame fell on Burrard and Dalrymple. Wellesley soon returned to active duty in Portugal, while Burrard and Dalrymple were pushed into a series of obscure administrative posts and never again held an active command. 

Burrard never applied for another command, but in 1810 as senior lieutenant-colonel he assumed the command of the Brigade of Guards in London. He died at Calshot Castle near Fawley, Hampshire, on 17 October 1813. He was buried in Lymington churchyard. He was succeeded by his eldest surviving son, Charles (1793–1870), an officer who rose to the rank of admiral in the Royal Navy and on whose death in 1870 the baronetcy became extinct.

Family
On 20 February 1789 he married Hannah, the daughter of Harry Darby, a London merchant; they had five sons and two daughters. All the sons served in the army or the navy. Two sons were killed in 1809 one of whom was acting as aide-de-camp to Sir John Moore at the battle of Corunna. He lost a third at the siege of San Sebastian which is said to have caused him to die of a broken heart. His wife survived him.

Miscellaneous 
He was nicknamed Betty by his troops.
The Burrard Inlet was named after his cousin, also named Sir Harry Burrard (1765–1840), by George Vancouver in June 1792.
One of Burrard's sons was killed at the Battle of Corunna and another died in the breach at the Siege of San Sebastian.
He appears in Naomi Novik's fifth Temeraire novel, Victory of Eagles.
He appears in Dewey Lambdin's novel Kings and Emperors, book 21 of the Alan Lewrie series

Notes

References
 
Attribution
 Endnotes
Wellington Despatches, vol. iii.; 
Napier's History of the Peninsular War, vol. i. book ii.; 
Memorial written by Sir Hew Dalrymple. Bart., of his proceedings as connected with the affairs of Spain, and the commencement of the Peninsular War, 1830;
The Whole Proceedings of the Court of Inquiry upon the conduct of Sir Hew Dalrymple relative to the Convention of Cintra, held in the Great Hall, Chelsea College, from Monday, 14 Nov., to Wednesday, 14 Dec. 1808.

Further reading
 
 
  

1755 births
1813 deaths
Burrard, Sir Harry, 1st Baronet
British Army generals
British Army personnel of the American Revolutionary War
British Army personnel of the French Revolutionary Wars
British Army commanders of the Napoleonic Wars
British MPs 1780–1784
British MPs 1784–1790
British MPs 1790–1796
Members of the Parliament of Great Britain for English constituencies
Members of the Parliament of the United Kingdom for English constituencies
UK MPs 1802–1806
Graduates of the Royal Military Academy, Woolwich
Royal Artillery officers
Grenadier Guards officers
Royal American Regiment officers